is a Japanese singer, actor and performer and is a member of Sexy Zone.

Career
In 2008, B.I.Shadow was formed as a Johnny's Jr. group. At that time the members were: Kento Nakajima, Fuma Kikuchi, and Misaki Takahata. During that year, they acted in the television drama Scrap Teacher.

On September 29, 2011, it was announced that a new five-member group called Sexy Zone would be formed and become a special supporter of "FIVB World Cup Volleyball 2011”. Kikuchi was part of the group.

Filmography

Television appearances
 Sexy Zone Channel (Fuji TV / 2014)
 NTV's 24-Hr TV (2022) (co-host, as member of YouTube channel Jyaninochaneru)

Television dramas
 Scrap Teacher (NTV / 2008), Fuma Kusumoto 
 Hancho Season 3 (2009) Episode 2 (guest)
 Mirai Nikki: Another World  (Fuji TV / 2012), Kosaka Oji
 Kamen Teacher (NTV / 2013), Kinzo Takehara 
 GTO: Great Teacher Onizuka (Fuji TV-KTV / 2014), Ryuichi Kuzuki
 Shin Naniwa Kinyuudou (Fuji TV / 2015), Hayato Ōhira
 Flowers for Algernon (TBS / 2015), Kazushige Kokubo
 The Girl Who Leapt Through Time (NTV / 2016), Shohei Fukamachi
 Uso no Sensou (Fuji TV / 2017), Kazuki Yahiro
 Babel Kyusaku (NTV / 2020), Kyusaku Mitsuhiro
 Itaiki ni Koishite (NTV / 2021), Iizuka Masaki 
 Fight Song (TBS / 2022), Natsukawa Shingo
 Dai byōin senkyo (NTV / 2023), Aoi Oni (Blue Demon), leader of the group that has taken a hospital hostage.  (First time appearing with fellow Johnny artist Sho Sakurai)

Movies
 Kamen Teacher The Movie (2014), Kinzo Takehara
 To the Supreme! (2022), Reito Asai

Other activities

YouTube
A new Johnny's YouTube channel called ジャにのちゃんねる (Janinochaneru), led by Arashi's Kazunari Ninomiya, was opened on April 25, 2021. Kikuchi was revealed as the third member to participate, on April 28, in the channel's 3rd official video.

Solo songs

References

Living people
Singers from Tokyo
Johnny & Associates
Japanese male pop singers
Japanese idols
1995 births
21st-century Japanese singers
21st-century Japanese male singers